Erbessa clite is a moth of the family Notodontidae first described by Francis Walker in 1854. It is found in Brazil, Venezuela, French Guiana and Guyana.

References

Moths described in 1854
Notodontidae of South America